A list of the names and numbers of the SECR K and SR K1 classes of 2-6-4 tank engines that formed the River class: locomotives initially running on the South Eastern and Chatham Railway (SECR), and subsequently operated by its successor, the Southern Railway (SR) from 1923. The majority of the class consisted of 2-cylinder locomotives built to an SECR design by Richard Maunsell, but one 3-cylinder version, the K1 class, was constructed by the Southern Railway in 1925. They were given the names of various rivers by the Southern Railway in a publicity measure to advertise the area that the railway served.

In 1928 the class was converted to the 2-cylinder U class and 3-cylinder U1 class 2-6-0 specifications after crews reported instability when running fast over the lightly laid rails of the former SECR network. The poor running culminated in the 1927 Sevenoaks railway accident, following which the locomotives were withdrawn. Once rebuilt, the former members of the K and K1 classes subsequently lost their names due to the bad publicity attached to them after this accident. All the rebuilt locomotives saw service with British Railways (BR), and all were withdrawn from service by 1966.

Tables of locomotive details

SECR and Southern Railway-built K class 2-cylinder locomotives

Southern Railway-built K1 class 3-cylinder locomotive

Unbuilt locomotives

A further 20 K class locomotives were projected, but the order was cancelled after the derailment of No. A800 River Cray at Sevenoaks, Kent in August 1927 and subsequent withdrawal of the class for rebuilding. The projected names were selected as thus:

A610 River Beaulieu,
A611 River Blackwater,
A612 River Bourne,
A613 River Bray,
A614 River Creedy
A615 River Ebble,
A616 River Eden,
A617 River Anton,
A618 River Hamble,
A619 River Taw,
A620 River Lymington,
A621 River Parret,
A622 River Medina,
A623 River Exe,
A624 River Allen,
A625 River Seaton,
A626 River Tiddy,
A627 River Tavy,
A628 River Lynher,
A629 River Titchfield.

These unused K class numbers, but not the names, were later allocated to the first production batch of the U class 2-6-0 from 1928. Although a batch of ten K1 class locomotives was also ordered during 1927, no names had been allocated before cancellation. Out of these unbuilt K class members, nos. A618 and A625 are preserved as U Class locomotives

Location link
 Swanage Railway

References

Notes

Bibliography

External links
  – Table showing key dates, mileage, running numbers, etc for the K and K1 locomotives
  – Table showing key dates, mileage, running numbers, etc for the U class locomotives
  – Table showing key dates, mileage, running numbers, etc for the U1 class locomotives

Standard gauge steam locomotives of Great Britain
2-6-4T locomotives
2-6-0 locomotives
K and K1 classes
Secr K And Sr K1 Class Locomotives